Mark Hill (born 10 July 1998) is a Scottish professional footballer who plays as a midfielder for Forfar Athletic. He has previously played for Celtic and was on loan at St Mirren, Forfar Athletic and Charlotte Independence.

Career
Hill first attracted media attention as a 13-year-old in April 2012, when he was selected for the reserve team at Hamilton Academical and was said to be in contention for the club's first team. He signed for Scottish champions Celtic a few months later, making steady progress through their youth system including appearances in the UEFA Youth League, in Scottish Youth Cup final wins and in the Scottish Challenge Cup.

Hill signed a new contract with Celtic in 2017, and moved on loan to St Mirren in January 2018, making three league appearances as the club gained promotion to the Scottish Premiership as winners of the 2017–18 Scottish Championship. He returned to Celtic but was then loaned again to third-tier Forfar Athletic, becoming a regular in their team until being recalled in January 2019. Two months later, he moved to Charlotte Independence in the USL Championship for the 2019 USL season, but was recalled by Celtic on 1 August 2019.

Hill has also represented Scotland at the under-17 and under-19 levels.

Career statistics

References 

Living people
1998 births
Scottish footballers
Celtic F.C. players
St Mirren F.C. players
Charlotte Independence players
USL Championship players
Scottish Professional Football League players
Association football midfielders
Scotland youth international footballers
Hamilton Academical F.C. players
Forfar Athletic F.C. players
Scottish expatriate footballers
Scottish expatriate sportspeople in the United States
Expatriate soccer players in the United States